Callidrepana vanbraeckeli is a moth in the family Drepanidae first described by Max Gaede in 1934. It is found on Sulawesi, Borneo, Sumatra and Peninsular Malaysia.

References

Moths described in 1934
Drepaninae
Moths of Indonesia
Moths of Malaysia